FANY may refer to:

 First Aid Nursing Yeomanry (FANY), a British all-female charity formed in 1907
 Hwanhee (born 1982), South Korean singer and actor, also known as Fany
 Tiffany Hwang (born 1989), of South Korean band Girl's Generation
 Nancy Estefania Zamora Garcia

See also
 Fanny (disambiguation)
 Fannie
 Fani (disambiguation)